Lampanyctus alatus is a species of lanternfish. It is found in parts of the Atlantic, Indian, and Pacific Oceans. It grows to  standard length.

References

External links

Lampanyctus
Fish of the Atlantic Ocean
Fish of the Indian Ocean
Fish of the Pacific Ocean
Fish described in 1896
Taxa named by George Brown Goode
Taxa named by Tarleton Hoffman Bean